Rubin Juster (September 9, 1923-January 1985) was an American professional football player who appeared in four games for the Boston Yanks of the National Football League in 1946.

References

1923 births
1985 deaths
Boston Yanks players
Minnesota State University, Mankato alumni